Discover a Lovelier You is the fourth studio album by American indie rock band Pernice Brothers, released on June 14, 2005, by Ashmont Records.

Track listing

References

Pernice Brothers albums
2005 albums